On the Jump is a 1918 American short comedy film featuring Harold Lloyd. A print of the film survives in the film archive of the Museum of Modern Art. Like many American films of the time, On the Jump was subject to cuts by city and state film censorship boards. For example, the Chicago Board of Censors cut the scene of the man thumbing his nose.

Cast
 Harold Lloyd 
 Snub Pollard 
 Bebe Daniels 
 William Blaisdell
 Sammy Brooks
 Lige Conley (credited as Lige Cromley)
 Billy Fay
 Helen Gilmore
 Lew Harvey
June Havoc (credited as June Hovick)
 Gus Leonard
 James Parrott
 Charles Stevenson (credited as Charles E. Stevenson)

See also
 Harold Lloyd filmography

References

External links

1918 films
American silent short films
1918 comedy films
1918 short films
American black-and-white films
Films directed by Alfred J. Goulding
Silent American comedy films
American comedy short films
Censored films
1910s American films